The 1964–65 NBA season was the Hawks' 16th season in the NBA and 10th season in St. Louis.

Regular season

Season standings

x – clinched playoff spot

Record vs. opponents

Game log

Playoffs

|- align="center" bgcolor="#ffcccc"
| 1
| March 24
| Baltimore
| L 105–108
| Lenny Wilkens (25)
| Bill Bridges (23)
| Richie Guerin (6)
| Kiel Auditorium5,320
| 0–1
|- align="center" bgcolor="#ccffcc"
| 2
| March 26
| Baltimore
| W 129–105
| Richie Guerin (28)
| Zelmo Beaty (12)
| Richie Guerin (10)
| Kiel Auditorium7,628
| 1–1
|- align="center" bgcolor="#ffcccc"
| 3
| March 27
| @ Baltimore
| L 99–131
| Zelmo Beaty (18)
| Zelmo Beaty (17)
| four players tied (3)
| Baltimore Civic Center6,358
| 1–2
|- align="center" bgcolor="#ffcccc"
| 4
| March 30
| @ Baltimore
| L 103–109
| Cliff Hagan (24)
| Bill Bridges (20)
| Lenny Wilkens (4)
| Baltimore Civic Center6,423
| 1–3
|-

Awards and records
Bob Pettit, All-NBA Second Team

References

Atlanta Hawks seasons
St. Louis
St. Louis Hawks
St. Louis Hawks